The 2002 Radio Disney Music Awards were held on November 16, 2002, at the Radio Disney studios. It was the second edition of the award.

Production
At that time the Radio Disney Music Awards was not an official ceremony. It was a special feature on Radio Disney held on November 16, 2002. The Radio Disney Music Awards contained 6 categories, with 3 nominees for votes in 4 weeks.

Nominees and winners
List of categories and winners in 2002.

Best Female Artist
Avril Lavigne
Jessica Simpson
Britney Spears

Best Male Artist
Aaron Carter
Lil' Romeo
Bow Wow

Best Song
"Complicated" – Avril Lavigne
"Girlfriend" – 'N Sync
"Not Too Young, Not Too Old" – Aaron Carter

Best Album
Let Go – Avril Lavigne
Irresistible – Jessica Simpson
Oh Aaron – Aaron Carter

Best Homework Song
"Complicated" – Avril Lavigne
"Girlfriend" – 'N Sync
"Not Too Young, Not Too Old" – Aaron Carter

Best Style
Hilary Duff
Amanda Bynes
Melissa Joan Hart

References

External links
Official website

Radio Disney Music Awards
Radio Disney Music Awards
Radio Disney Music Awards
Radio Disney Music Awards
2002 awards in the United States